Sándor Major (born 31 July 1965) is a Hungarian wrestler. He competed in the men's Greco-Roman 90 kg at the 1988 Summer Olympics.

References

1965 births
Living people
Hungarian male sport wrestlers
Olympic wrestlers of Hungary
Wrestlers at the 1988 Summer Olympics
Sport wrestlers from Budapest
20th-century Hungarian people